Gustav A. Hanssen (November 22, 1869 - January 4, 1944) was an American architect. He designed private residences in Davenport, Iowa and later moved to San Diego, California. Several of his buildings are listed on the National Register of Historic Places (NRHP).

Works
Sacred Heart Cathedral Rectory, Davenport, Iowa (1895); NRHP-listed
John C. Schricker House, Davenport, Iowa (1896); NRHP-listed
Buffalo High School, Buffalo, Iowa (1900); NRHP-listed
Central Fire Station (Davenport, Iowa), Davenport, Iowa (1901); NRHP-listed
E.A. Shaw House, Davenport, Iowa (1901); NRHP-listed
Walsh Flats/Langworth Building, Davenport, Iowa (1910); NRHP-listed
One or more buildings in the Oak Lane Historic District, Davenport, Iowa; NRHP-listed
One or more buildings in the Riverview Terrace Historic District, Davenport, Iowa; NRHP-listed
One or more buildings in the Vander Veer Park Historic District, Davenport, Iowa; NRHP-listed
Yuma County Courthouse, Yuma, Arizona (1928; with Ralph Swearingen); NRHP-listed

References

1869 births
1944 deaths
People from Davenport, Iowa
People from San Diego
University of Illinois alumni
19th-century American architects
20th-century American architects
Architects from Iowa
Architects from California